Harrison Walsh is a Welsh para discus thrower. He participated at the 2022 Commonwealth Games in the athletics competition, being awarded the bronze medal in the men's discus throw (F44)/(F64) event.

Walsh took up discus after a knee injury ended his career as a rugby player at the age of 18. He was due to participate at the 2020 Summer Paralympics in the men's discus event but was unable to start because of an ankle injury.

References

External links 

Living people
Place of birth missing (living people)
Year of birth missing (living people)
Welsh male discus throwers
Welsh disabled sportspeople
British male discus throwers
Paralympic athletes of Great Britain
Athletes (track and field) at the 2022 Commonwealth Games
Commonwealth Games bronze medallists for Wales
Commonwealth Games medallists in athletics
Medallists at the 2022 Commonwealth Games